K. Sreenivas Reddy (also spelled Srinivas, born 7 September 1949) is an Indian Telugu language journalist and a political analyst. He was the  editor of Vishalandhra newspaper. He is presently editor of Mana Telangana, a Telugu daily and Praja Paksham.

Early life
Sreenivas Reddy is a B.Sc. graduate.

Career
Sreenivas Reddy appears on all prominent Telugu news channels for his political analysis. He is also secretary of Indian Journalists Union.

References

External links
 Profile

Indian male journalists
Living people
Journalists from Andhra Pradesh
Year of birth missing (living people)